Stephens is a surname.

Stephens may also refer to:

Places
Two islands in Queensland, Australia:
 Stephens Island (Torres Strait)
 Stephens Island (Great Barrier Reef)
 Port Stephens (New South Wales), a natural harbour in Australia
 Stephens Island, New Zealand, in the Marlborough Sounds in the South Island

In the United States
 Stephens, Arkansas
 Stephens, Georgia
 Stephens, Kentucky
 Stephens, Missouri
 Stephens City, Virginia
 Stephens County, Georgia
 Stephens County, Oklahoma
 Stephens County, Texas
 Stephens Passage, a channel in the Alexander Archipelago in southeastern Alaska
 Stephens Ridge (California), a ridge in Plumas National Forest
 A.H. Stephens State Historic Park, Georgia, U.S.A.
 Stephens State Park in New Jersey

Other uses
 Stephens College in Columbia, Missouri
 Stephens Inc., an American investment bank

See also

R. v. Dudley and Stephens, a court case
Port Stephens (disambiguation)
Stevens (disambiguation)
Stephen (disambiguation)
Justice Stephens (disambiguation)